CJDS-FM is a community radio station that operates at 94.7 FM in Saint-Pamphile, Quebec, Canada.

Owned by Radio FM 200, the station received CRTC approval in 2001.

References

External links
 

Jds
Jds
Jds
Radio stations established in 2001
2001 establishments in Quebec